Ainbail  is a village in the southern state of Karnataka, India. It is located in the Siddapur taluk of Uttara Kannada district in Karnataka.

See also
 Uttara Kannada
 Districts of Karnataka

References

External links
 

Villages in Uttara Kannada district